Traboch is a municipality in the district of Leoben in the Austrian state of Styria.

References

Cities and towns in Leoben District